Natural Bridge National Forest was established by the U.S. Forest Service in Virginia on May 16, 1918 with . On July 22, 1933 the entire forest was transferred to George Washington National Forest and the name was discontinued.

References

External links
Forest History Society
Listing of the National Forests of the United States and Their Dates (from the Forest History Society website) Text from Davis, Richard C., ed. Encyclopedia of American Forest and Conservation History. New York: Macmillan Publishing Company for the Forest History Society, 1983. Vol. II, pp. 743-788.

Former National Forests of Virginia